Kambal, Karibal (International title: Heart & Soul / ) is a Philippine television drama supernatural series broadcast by GMA Network. Directed by Don Michael Perez, it stars Bianca Umali, Miguel Tanfelix, Pauline Mendoza and Kyline Alcantara. It premiered on November 27, 2017 on the network's Telebabad line up replacing Alyas Robin Hood. The series concluded on August 3, 2018 with a total of 178 episodes. It was replaced by Onanay in its timeslot.

The series is originally titled as Santa Santita. It is streaming online on YouTube.

Premise
The story centers on twins Crisanta and Criselda. Criselda dies due to a rare disease but retains her spirit that is only visible to her sister Crisanta. Their bond starts to fall apart when they both fall in love with Diego. The rivalry between them builds up when their mother's affections are focused on Crisanta. When Criselda's emotions consume her and her soul finds another person's body to inhabit, she returns to take both her mother's affection and Diego's love.

Cast and characters

Lead cast
 Bianca Umali as Crisanta "Crisan" Enriquez Magpantay / Victoria Enriquez Magpantay
 Miguel Tanfelix as Diego Ocampo de Villa
 Pauline Mendoza as Criselda "Crisel" Enriquez Magpantay / Amanda Enriquez Magpantay
 Kyline Alcantara as Francheska "Cheska" Enriquez de Villa / Grace Akeem Nazar

Supporting cast
 Jean Garcia as Teresa Abaya-Bautista  
 Marvin Agustin as Raymond de Villa / Samuel Calderon
 Alfred Vargas as Allan Magpantay
 Carmina Villarroel as Geraldine Enriquez-Magpantay
 Gloria Romero as Maria Anicia Enriquez
 Christopher de Leon as Emmanuel "Manuel" de Villa
 Jeric Gonzales as Michael Roy "Makoy" Claveria
 Franchesca Salcedo as Norilyn "Nori" Salcedo / Frenny
 Rafa Siguion-Reyna as Vincent De Jesus
 Sheree Bautista as Lilian Ocampo
 Raquel Monteza as Mildred Abaya

Guest cast
 Gardo Versoza as Noli Bautista
 Katrina Halili as Nida Generoso
 Amalia Rosales as Dolores Amelia
 Rez Cortez as an exorcism priest
 Robert Ortega as Priest
 Froilan Sales as Jericho
 Mike Lloren as Delfin Claveria
 Miggs Cuaderno as James Martinez 
 Tina Paner as Azon Martinez
 Lynn Ynchausti-Cruz as Victoria Magpantay
 Juan Rodrigo as Tomas Magpantay
 Kelvin Miranda as John "Tembong" Enriquez
 Brent Valdez as Jolo
 Angela Evangelista as Olive Enriquez
 Princess Guevarra as Madel Gutierrez
 Tanya Gomez as Edna Gutierrez
 Gerald Madrid as Dado
 Jenny Miller as Lerma 
 Elle Ramirez as Jane 
 Lou Sison as Luisa
 Angie Ferro as Amang Editha
 Diva Montelaba as Linda
 Arra San Agustin as young Geraldine
 Therese Malvar as young Teresa
 Empress Schuck as young Anicia
 Ashley Cabrera as young Cheska
 Jazz Yburan as young Crisan
 Caprice Mendez as young Crisel and Cristiana Enriquez Magpantay
 Seth dela Cruz as young Diego
 Marc Justine Alvarez as young Makoy
 Roence Santos as Black Lady / Ganeva
 Eliza Pineda as Patricia Gonzales
 Sheila Marie Rodriguez as Jenny Ginez
 Ana Capri as Clara
 Kenken Nuyad as Bugoy
 Lollie Mara as Celia
 Hannah Precillas as Manilyn
 Maureen Larrazabal as Strong Beauty
 Scarlet Petite as Suzy
 Inah de Belen as Phoebe
 Kevin Santos as Xander Liwanag
 Jake Vargas as Darren Olivar
 Maricar de Mesa as Valerie Olivar
 Lianne Valentin as Madeline
 Yasser Marta as Andre
 Sunshine Dizon as Maricar Akeem Nazar
 Ping Medina as Obet
 Tart Carlos as Gladys
 Andrew Gan as Dalton
 Pekto as Olsec
 Dave Bornea as Claudio Calderon
 Luz Fernandez as Magda Liwanag

Ratings
According to AGB Nielsen Philippines' Nationwide Urban Television Audience Measurement People in television homes, the pilot episode of Kambal, Karibal earned an 8.5% rating. While the final episode scored a 13% rating. In National Urban Philippines Audience Shares, it got its highest rating on January 22, 2018 with a 42.3% rating. Due to its high ratings, the show was extended until August 2018.

Accolades

References

External links
 
 

2017 Philippine television series debuts
2018 Philippine television series endings
Filipino-language television shows
GMA Network drama series
Philippine supernatural television series
Television shows set in the Philippines